The 1962 United States Senate election in Oregon was held on November 8, 1962 to select the U.S. Senator from the state of Oregon. Democratic Senator Wayne Morse decided to seek re-election for a fourth term. He defeated Republican candidate Sig Unander in the general election. This would be the last time Democrats won the Class 3 Senate seat from Oregon until Ron Wyden's victory in the 1996 special election.

Candidates

Democratic
Wayne Morse – incumbent Senator since 1945.

Republican
Sig Unander – State Treasurer of Oregon (1953–1959).
Edwin Durno – U.S. Representative.

Results

References

Oregon
1962
Senate